Charlie McGuckin (born 1999) is an Irish hurler who plays for club side Naomh Éanna and at inter-county level with the Wexford senior hurling team. He usually lines out as a forward.

Career

Son of Offaly All-Ireland-winner Shane, McGuckin first played at juvenile and underage levels with the Naomh Éanna club before progressing onto the senior team. He won a Wexford SHC title in 2018 after beating St. Martin's in the final. McGuckin first appeared on the inter-county scene as a member of the Wexford minor hurling team in 2017 before later captaining the under-20 team. He was drafted onto the Wexford senior hurling team for the 2022 season.

Career statistics

Honours

Naomh Éanna
Wexford Senior Hurling Championship: 2018

References

1999 births
Living people
Naomh Éanna hurlers
Wexford inter-county hurlers